The Marist Saints is a rugby league club based in Mount Albert, New Zealand. They currently compete in the top grade in Auckland Rugby League, the Fox Memorial Premiership.

History
Founded in 1919, the Marist club first won the Fox Memorial in 1924. They originally played at the Auckland Domain before moving to their current home, in Murray Halberg Park. Their lower grade teams now also play matches at Margaret Griffen Park in Lynfield.

First season and match
In 1919 Marist entered teams in first grade and also in the second grade. The second grade side defaulted their first match and then withdrew from the competition.
On May 3, 1919, Marist played in their first ever match. It was played at Victoria Park on the #2 field against Newton Rangers. There were 4,500 spectators to watch the match which was played simultaneously with the Maritime v City Rovers match on the adjacent field. Marist lost 28–3 with Petterson scoring their only points through a try. They struggled throughout the season losing all their first grade matches.

First win in first grade competition (Roope Rooster)
They had their first win in a first grade competition in the first round of the Roope Rooster competition on July 26, 1919. They defeated North Shore Albions on Auckland Domain by 17 points to 3.

First win in first grade
In 1920 Marist entered teams in the first grade, second grade, and fourth grade. Their second grade side withdrew after 11 rounds, while their fourth grade side withdrew after 2 rounds. Their first grade team drew in round 2 against Newton Rangers but then had their first ever win in the first grade championship (Monteith Shield) when they defeated Grafton Athletic 15–3 at Victoria Park. Bill Stormont and Billy Ghent scored tries and A. Eustace kicked a goal. They ultimately won 7 games along with their draw and finished third in the seven team competition.

2000 to 2005
Between 2000 and 2005 the Saints were involved in the Bartercard Cup alongside the Richmond Bulldogs as the Marist Richmond Brothers.

Notable players

New Zealand representatives

Kiwi representative number in square brackets:

William "Bill" Stormont [140] (1920) (62 matches for Marist from 1920 to 1924)
Hec Brisbane [153] (1924–32) (158 matches for Marist from 1923 to 1934)
Jim O'Brien [157] (1924–28) (92 matches for Marist from 1924 to 1930)
Lyall Stewart [163] (1924) (15 matches for Marist in 1924)
Charles "Pope" Gregory [171] (1925–30) (87 matches for Marist from 1924 to 1931)
Jack Kirwan [174] (1925–27) (40 matches for Marist from 1924 to 1928)
Arthur Singe [179] (1925–26) (48 matches for Marist from 1921 to 1926)
Claude List [190] (1932) (55 matches for Marist from 1930 to 1934)
Wilfrid Hassan [221] (1932) (94 matches for Marist from 1928 to 1934)
Gordon "Stump" Campbell [223] (1932) (93 matches for Marist from 1928 to 1934)
Norm Campbell [224] (1932) (104 matches for Marist from 1929 to 1936)
Jim Laird [226] (1932-35) (56 matches for Marist from 1932 to 1935)
Alan Clarke [227] (1932) (69 matches for Marist from 1929 to 1934)
John Anderson [256] (1938)
Robert Grotte [260] (1938) (37 matches for Marist from 1938 to 1940)
Gordon Midgely [263]
William "George" Davidson [302]
Des Barchard [307]
Harry "Doug" Anderson [311]
Robert "Jimmy" Edwards [331]
Ronald McKay [344]
Neville Denton [359]
Brian Reidy [383]
William "Bill" Schultz [394]
Paul Schultz [434]
Oscar Danielson [454]
Anthony "Tony" Kriletich [459]
Gene Ngamu [642]
Motu Tony [686]
Francis Meli [689]
Sonny Bill Williams [706]
Roy Asotasi [710]
Jerome Ropati [716]
Kalifa Fai-Fai Loa [766]
David Ue'ikaetau Fusitu'a [799]
Tuimoala Lolohea [791]

Other New Zealand rugby league representatives
Includes players who played for New Zealand but not while at the Marist club
Bob Mitchell [87] (2 matches for Marist in 1919)
Neville St George [178] (15 matches for Marist from 1919 to 1921)
Ernie Herring [112] (4 matches for Marist in 1921)
John Lang [127] (38 matches for Marist from 1921 to 1924)
Nelson Bass [137] (24 matches for Marist from 1922 to 1923)
Norm Loveridge [141] (24 matches for Marist from 1920 to 1922)
George Gardiner [185] (13 matches for Marist in 1924)

Notable former juniors include Roy Asotasi, Sonny Bill Williams, Jerome Ropati, Motu Tony, Francis Meli, Gene Ngamu, Rudi Wulf, Ben Waerea-Fisher, Siuatonga Likiliki, Manu Ma'u, Bill Tupou, Kalifa Fai-Fai Loa, David Fusitua, Mason Lino, Tuimoala Lolohea, Delouise Hoeter, Adam Tuimavave Gerrard, Lamar Liolevave, Anthony Swann, Des Barchard.

Other notable players
Johnny Simpson played for Marist seniors from 1941 to 1944 and was a junior there. He switched codes in the mid-1940s and became an All Black in 1947, playing 30 matches for New Zealand up until 1950.

Marist Senior Team records (1919–1944 and 2022)
The season record for the most senior men's team in the club.

Club titles

Marist Saints grade championships (1919–1942)

 1924 First Grade
 1927 Sixth Grade knockout competition
 1930 Fifth Grade
 1931 First Grade, Third Grade Open, Fourth Grade, & Fifth Grade
 1933 Third Grade Open, & Fourth Grade
 1934 Third Grade Intermediate
 1935 Reserve Grade
 1938 First Grade

Other titles

 1928 Roope Rooster & Stormont Shield
 1929 Roope Rooster & Stormont Shield
 1932 Roope Rooster & Stormont Shield
 1937 Roope Rooster & Stormont Shield
 1939 Roope Rooster
 1946 Roope Rooster
 1950 Stormont Shield
 1958 Roope Rooster & Stormont Shield
 1965 Stormont Shield
 1966 Roope Rooster & Stormont Shield
 1971 Roope Rooster
 1992 Sharman Cup
 1997 Roope Rooster

All time top point scorers (1919–1943)
The point scoring lists are compiled from matches played in matches from the first grade championship, the Roope Rooster, Phelan Shield, and Sharman Cup only. One-off matches and exhibition matches are not included. The statistics for the combined Marist-North Shore team of 1942 are included.

Gallery

References

External links
Official ARL Site

 
Rugby clubs established in 1919
1919 establishments in New Zealand